The 2015 Formula Renault 3.5 Series season was a multi-event motor racing championship for open wheel, formula racing cars held across Europe. The championship featured drivers competing in Formula Renault 3.5 formula race cars that conformed to the technical regulations for the championship. The 2015 season was the eleventh and final season Formula Renault 3.5 Series  organised by Renault Sport, after it was announced that the organisation would withdraw its backing of the championship at the end of the season.

The season began at Motorland Aragón on 25 April and finished on 18 October at Circuito de Jerez.

Teams and drivers

Driver changes
Changed teams
 After competing for Tech 1 Racing at the Nürburgring during the 2014 season, Alfonso Celis Jr. switched to AVF for a full 2015 campaign.
 Jazeman Jaafar switched from ISR Racing to Fortec Motorsports.
 Nicholas Latifi, who competed in three rounds in 2014 for Tech 1 Racing, joined Arden Motorsport for a full-time campaign in 2015.
 Roberto Merhi switched from Zeta Corse to Pons Racing. He had also signed a short-term contract to race in Formula One for the Manor F1 Team.
 Meindert van Buuren switched from Pons Racing to Lotus.

Entering/Re–Entering FR3.5
 Formula Renault 2.0 Alps driver Philo Paz Armand made his Formula Renault 3.5 début with Pons Racing.
 Bruno Bonifacio, who graduated from Eurocup Formula Renault 2.0, joined the series with International Draco Racing.
 Tom Dillmann, who raced in the GP2 Series and Porsche Carrera Cup France in 2014, moved to the series with Carlin, alongside newcomer Sean Gelael, who graduated from the FIA European Formula 3 Championship.
 Tio Ellinas moved from the GP2 Series to the Formula Renault 3.5 Series, joining Strakka Racing.
 Gustav Malja, who raced for Josef Kaufmann Racing in the Eurocup Formula Renault 2.0, graduated to the series, joining Strakka Racing.
 Roy Nissany graduated to the series from the European Formula Three Championship, competing with Tech 1 Racing.
 Egor Orudzhev, who raced for Tech 1 Racing in the Eurocup Formula Renault 2.0, joined Arden Motorsport.
 Aurélien Panis, who raced for the ART Junior Team in the Eurocup Formula Renault 2.0, joined fellow French team Tech 1 Racing.
 Facu Regalia, who raced a part-season in the GP2 Series with Hilmer Motorsport, originally signed to race for Zeta Corse, but left the team prior to the start of the season to join Comtec Racing. However, prior to the first round he switched to Auto GP with FMS Racing.
 Dean Stoneman, the GP3 Series runner-up, returned to the series with DAMS.
 Nyck de Vries, the 2014 Eurocup Formula Renault 2.0 and Formula Renault 2.0 Alps champion, made his series début with DAMS.

Leaving FR3.5
 Zoël Amberg and Oliver Webb, who contested three rounds of the championship in 2014, moved to the FIA World Endurance Championship, racing in the LMP2 category for Team SARD Morand. Amberg will also race for Lazarus in the GP2 Series.
 William Buller, who raced for Arden Motorsport in 2014, joined Kondō Racing in Japanese Super Formula.
 Pierre Gasly, the runner-up of the 2014 season, joined the GP2 Series with DAMS. Gasly also took part in the final three rounds of the 2014 GP2 season with Caterham Racing.
 Luca Ghiotto, who raced for International Draco Racing in 2014, moved to the GP3 Series with Trident Racing, the team with which he contested two rounds of the 2014 season. He will be joined at the team by Óscar Tunjo, who raced for Pons Racing in 2014.
 Norman Nato, who drove for DAMS in 2014, entered the GP2 Series with Arden International.
 Carlos Sainz, Jr. the 2014 champion, graduated to Formula One, racing for Toro Rosso alongside fellow rookie Max Verstappen.
 Sergey Sirotkin, who finished fifth for Fortec Motorsports in 2014, joined the GP2 Series with Rapax.
 Marco Sørensen, who raced for Tech 1 Racing in 2014, entered the GP2 Series with Carlin, and the FIA World Endurance Championship with Aston Martin Racing.
 Will Stevens, who finished sixth for Strakka Racing in 2014, graduated to Formula One, racing for the Manor F1 Team. Stevens made his Formula One debut with Caterham in the 2014 Abu Dhabi Grand Prix.
 Marlon Stöckinger, who finished ninth for Lotus in 2014, joined Status Grand Prix in the GP2 Series.
 Cameron Twynham, who contested three rounds of the championship for Comtec Racing in 2014, joined the Porsche Supercup with MOMO-Megatron.

Mid-season changes
GP3 Series driver Alex Fontana replaced Roberto Merhi at Pons Racing for the Monaco round due to Merhi's Formula One commitments with the Manor F1 Team on the same weekend. Former Euroseries 3000 champion Will Bratt deputised for Merhi at the Silverstone round due to his participation in the Italian Grand Prix. Bratt was replaced by GP2 Series driver René Binder at the Nürburgring round, after Merhi disbanded his contract with Pons. At the Le Mans round, Binder was replaced by Nikita Zlobin.
After missing the first four rounds of the season, Comtec Racing returned to the championship at the Red Bull Ring with a single car for Eurocup Formula Renault 2.0 leader Louis Delétraz.
Marlon Stöckinger replaced Meindert van Buuren at Lotus for the Red Bull Ring round after the team cancelled their contract with him. Van Buuren in turn replaced Philo Paz Armand at Pons Racing, who missed the event due to visa issues.
GP2 Series driver Nick Yelloly replaced Stöckinger at the Silverstone round due to his GP2 Series commitments with Status Grand Prix at Monza.
Euroformula Open driver Yu Kanamaru replaced Philo Paz Armand at Pons Racing for the Nürburgring round due to continued visa issues for Armand.
Pietro Fantin will be replaced at Le Mans by series' returnee André Negrão, who had three consecutive seasons with Draco Racing in 2011–2013.

Team changes
 After five seasons in FR3.5, ISR Racing withdrew from the championship to focus on Sports car racing.
 British team Carlin returned to the championship after withdrawing from the 2014 season.
 Zeta Corse withdrew from the championship before the opening round after failing to secure fully funded drivers for the season.

Race calendar and results
The calendar for the 2015 season was announced on 20 October 2014, on the final day of the 2014 season. The championship returns to the Red Bull Ring, Silverstone and Le Mans. Monza, Moscow Raceway and Paul Ricard, which all held races in 2014, have been removed from the schedule.

On 11 February 2015, it was announced that the Silverstone round would be moved back a week due to the circuit reacquiring the rights to host the British round of the 2015 MotoGP season.

Championship standings
Points system
Points were awarded to the top 10 classified finishers.

Drivers' Championship

Teams' Championship

References

External links
 Renault-Sport official website

Formula Renault 3.5
Formula Renault 3.5
World Series Formula V8 3.5 seasons
Renault 3.5